Minuscule 723 (in the Gregory-Aland numbering), Θε53 (von Soden), is a Greek minuscule manuscript of the New Testament, on paper. Palaeographically it has been assigned to the 15th century. Scrivener labelled it as 828e.

Description 

The codex contains the text of the four Gospels, on 397 paper leaves (size ).

The text is written in one column per page, with 38 lines per page.

Text 

Kurt Aland did not place the Greek text of the codex in any category.
It was not examined using the Claremont Profile Method,
and it lacks the Pericope Adulterae (John 7:53-8:11).

History 

Gregory dated the manuscript to the 15th century. Currently the manuscript is dated by the INTF to the 15th century.

The manuscript once belonged to Seb. Tengnagel.

It was added to the list of New Testament manuscripts by Scrivener (828) and Gregory (723). Gregory saw the manuscript in 1887.

At present the manuscript is housed at the Austrian National Library (Theol. gr. 122) in Vienna.

See also 

 List of New Testament minuscules
 Biblical manuscript
 Textual criticism

References

Further reading 

 

Greek New Testament minuscules
15th-century biblical manuscripts
Biblical manuscripts of the Austrian National Library